Arkyt (Arkıt) is a rural locality (a selo) in Kosh-Agachsky District, the Altai Republic, Russia. The population was 62 as of 2016. There are 2 streets.

Geography 
Arkyt is located 141 km southwest of Kosh-Agach (the district's administrative centre) by road. Belyashi is the nearest rural locality.

References 

Rural localities in Kosh-Agachsky District